Peshawar is situated near the eastern end of the Khyber Pass and sits mainly on the Iranian plateau along with the rest of the Khyber-Pakhtunkhwa. Peshawar is literally a frontier city of South-Central Asia and was historically part of the Silk Road.

The Valley of Peshawar is covered with consolidated deposits of silt, sands and gravel of recent geological times. The flood Plains/Zones are the areas between Kabul River and Budni Nala. The meander flood plain extends from Warsak in the Northwest towards Southeast in the upper Northern half of the district. The Kabul river enters the district in the Northwest. On entering the Peshawar Plain, the Kabul River is divided into several channels. Its two main channels are the Adizai River Eastward flows along the boundary with Charsadda District. Another channel branching from the right bank of the Naguman River is the Shah Alam, which again merges with Naguman River further in the East. In general the sub-soil strata is composed of gravels, boulders, and sands overlain by silts and clays.

Winter in Peshawar starts from mid November to the end of March. Summer months are May to September.

Peshawar is not situated in the monsoon region, unlike the other northern parts of Pakistan. But occasionally monsoon currents make it as far as Peshawar causing downpours. This can be witnessed in the erratic monsoon of 2015 when the monsoon moisture was going well into eastern Afghanistan. The winter rainfall due to western disturbances shows a higher record during the months of February and April. The highest winter rainfall has been recorded in March, while the highest summer rainfall in the month of August. The average winter rainfall is higher than that of the summer. The relative humidity varies from 46% in June to 76% in August.

Peshawar's environment has suffered tremendously due to an ever-increasing population, unplanned growth and a poor regulatory framework. Air and noise pollution is a significant issue in several parts of the city, and the water quality, once considered to be exceptionally good, is also fast deteriorating.

In addition the city has lost  of agriculture land during the two decades (1965–85).

References

Peshawar
Peshawar